Daphrose Mukankubito Gahakwa is a Rwandan politician who served as Minister of Education from 2008 to 2009.

Gahakwa grew up in Uganda, and graduated from Makerere University with a Bachelor of Science in 1996. She went on to earn an MSc in plant breeding (1997) and PhD (2001) from the University of East Anglia in England. Her PhD was entitled "Molecular and Biochemical Studies of Transgene expression in Rice and Maize". She was appointed Minister of Education following a cabinet reshuffle in March 2008, having previously been Minister of State for Agriculture. In July 2009, she was replaced as Minister of Education by Charles Murigande. She also served as Chancellor of the National University of Rwanda. In October 2020, she was detained  in prison to assist investigations into allegations of corruption and conflict of interest committed while she was still serving.

References

Living people
Makerere University alumni
Alumni of the University of East Anglia
Agriculture ministers of Rwanda
Education ministers of Rwanda
Women government ministers of Rwanda
21st-century Rwandan women politicians
21st-century Rwandan politicians
Year of birth missing (living people)